Tom Town Historic District, also known as Calton Mill, Carter Canning Co., and Sperandio Canning Co., is a national historic district located along Little Flat Creek approximately 4.5 miles south of Pleasant Ridge, Barry County, Missouri. The district consists of two buildings (a mill and a cannery) and a single structure (a boiler house) which are the last remnants of an historic Ozarks agricultural complex.

It was added to the National Register of Historic Places in 1989.

References

Historic districts on the National Register of Historic Places in Missouri
Industrial buildings and structures on the National Register of Historic Places in Missouri
Buildings and structures in Barry County, Missouri
National Register of Historic Places in Barry County, Missouri